Meristina is an extinct genus of brachiopods that lived from the Late Ordovician to the Middle Devonian of Asia, Europe, and North America. Meristina had a smooth convex shell with a one-inch diameter.

Sources
 Fossils (Smithsonian Handbooks) by David Ward (Page 85)

External links
Meristina in the Paleobiology Database

Spiriferida
Prehistoric brachiopod genera
Ordovician brachiopods
Silurian brachiopods
Devonian brachiopods
Paleozoic animals of Asia
Prehistoric animals of Europe
Paleozoic brachiopods of North America
Late Ordovician first appearances
Middle Devonian genus extinctions
Paleozoic life of Ontario
Paleozoic life of British Columbia
Paleozoic life of Manitoba
Paleozoic life of New Brunswick
Paleozoic life of the Northwest Territories
Paleozoic life of Nova Scotia
Paleozoic life of Nunavut
Paleozoic life of Quebec
Paleozoic life of Yukon